Teodor Muzaka or Theodore Musachi may refer to three despots of medieval Albania:

Teodor I Muzaka (died 1389)
Teodor II Muzaka (1389–1417)
Teodor III Muzaka (1417–1444)